Abbas Kargar (born 21 March 1956) is an Iranian former footballer who played as a midfielder for Persepolis and the Iran national football team.

References

Iranian footballers
Living people
1965 births
Persepolis F.C. players
Association football midfielders
Iran international footballers
People from Ray, Iran